Newton Cardoso Junior (born 11 November 1979) is a Brazilian politician who has been a Brazilian Democratic Movement Party Member of the Chamber of Deputies since 2015.

He was named in the 2016 Panama Papers leak.

His father is the former Governor of Minas Gerais Newton Cardoso.

References

1979 births
Living people
Members of the Chamber of Deputies (Brazil) from Minas Gerais
Brazilian Democratic Movement politicians
People named in the Panama Papers